The dusky-brown oriole (Oriolus phaeochromus) is a species of bird in the family Oriolidae.
It is endemic to North Maluku.

Its natural habitat is subtropical or tropical moist lowland forests. Alternate names for the dusky-brown oriole include the dusky oriole, Gray's oriole, Halmahera oriole and Moluccan oriole.

References

dusky-brown oriole
Birds of Halmahera
dusky-brown oriole
dusky-brown oriole
Taxonomy articles created by Polbot